Wedge Peak can refer to

 Wedge Peak (Alaska), a peak in the Alaska Range
 Wedge Peak (British Columbia), a peak in British Columbia
 Wedge Peak (Greenland), a peak in the Stauning Alps